SC-17599 is a steroid derivative drug discovered in 1968 which acts as a selective μ-opioid receptor agonist, with little or no affinity for the δ-opioid or κ-opioid receptors. It is an active analgesic in vivo, more potent than codeine or pethidine but slightly less potent than morphine,  and produces similar effects to morphine in animals but with less sedation

See also 
 Cyproterone acetate

References 

Opioids
Pregnanes
Ketones
Organofluorides
Acetate esters
Mu-opioid receptor agonists